Antonín Skopový (born 1902, date of death unknown) was a Czech wrestler. He competed in the Greco-Roman bantamweight at the 1924 Summer Olympics.

References

External links
 

1902 births
Year of death missing
Olympic wrestlers of Czechoslovakia
Wrestlers at the 1924 Summer Olympics
Czech male sport wrestlers
Place of birth missing